In the history of the National Football League, there have been twelve starts streaks of at least 100 consecutive games by eleven different quarterbacks, with four of those with a regular season streak of at least 200 games.

Brett Favre has held the record since November 7, 1999 when he made his 117th consecutive start against the Chicago Bears. His consecutive starts streak is also the longest all-time for a non-special teams player. On December 5, 2010, playing for the Minnesota Vikings against the Buffalo Bills, Favre was knocked out of the game on the first drive with a sprained SC joint injury to his right shoulder, caused by a hit from linebacker Arthur Moats. After a snowstorm delayed the following Sunday's game against the New York Giants to Monday, December 13, Favre was ruled inactive, ending his streak at a record 297 games (321 including playoffs).

Below is a list of the top 25 quarterbacks to achieve the longest consecutive regular season starts at their position.

All-time consecutive starts streaks 
Bold denotes an active streak.

See also 
 Iron man
 List of most consecutive starts and games played by National Football League players
 List of National Football League records (individual)#Starts
 List of starting quarterbacks in the National Football League
 List of most consecutive games with touchdown passes in the National Football League
 List of most wins by a National Football League starting quarterback

References 

National Football League records and achievements
National Football League lists